Joel David Kaplan (born 1969) is an American political advisor and former lobbyist working as Facebook's vice president of global public policy. Previously, he served eight years in the George W. Bush administration. After leaving the Bush administration, he was a lobbyist for energy companies.

Within Facebook, Kaplan is seen as a strong conservative voice. He has helped place conservatives in key positions in the company, and advocated for the interests of the right-wing websites Breitbart News and The Daily Caller within the company. He has successfully advocated for changes in Facebook's algorithm to promote the interests of right-wing publications, and successfully prevented Facebook from closing down Facebook groups that were alleged to have circulated fake news, arguing that doing so would disproportionately target conservatives.

Early life and education 
Kaplan was born in Weston, Massachusetts, the third child of an attorney and a college administrator. He earned a Bachelor of Arts from Harvard University in 1991 during which time he was active student democrat and also briefly dated his future colleague at Facebook, Sheryl Sandberg. According to a friend of Kaplan's at Harvard, his political views shifted because of campus demonstrations opposing the U.S. invasion of Kuwait during the Gulf War. After college, he served as an Artillery Officer in the United States Marine Corps for four years. He then earned a Juris Doctor from Harvard Law School in 1998.

Career 
After law school, he clerked for Supreme Court Justice Antonin Scalia and Fourth Circuit Court of Appeals Judge J. Michael Luttig. He was an active conservative Democrat during the early-1990s. He registered as a Republican in the late-1990s.

George W. Bush 2000 campaign

Kaplan worked as a policy advisor on George W. Bush's 2000 presidential campaign, during which he was a participant in the Brooks Brothers riot on November 22, 2000.

George W. Bush administration (2001–2009) 
From 2001 to 2003 he was special assistant to the president for policy within the White House Chief of Staff’s office. Then he served as deputy director of the Office of Management And Budget, serving under Joshua Bolten. While at the OMB, in 2006, Kaplan said the administration would cut the deficit by half by 2009.

In April 2006 he returned to the White House as the White House Deputy Chief of Staff for policy, taking over policy planning duties from Karl Rove as part of a staff shake-up by White House Chief of Staff Josh Bolten. Blake Gottesman was the other Deputy Chief of Staff and focused on operations. He was responsible for the development and implementation of the Administration’s policy agenda.

While in the Bush administration, Kaplan was seen as very close to Bolten.

Private sector 
Prior to joining Facebook, Kaplan was the executive vice president for public policy and external affairs for Energy Future Holdings (EFH), where he oversaw company-wide public affairs and led EFH’s efforts to "publicly demonstrate and communicate its role in the energy industry".

Facebook 
In May 2011 Facebook hired Kaplan as its vice president of U.S. public policy, as part of a Facebook's effort to "strengthen" the company's ties to Republican lawmakers on Capitol Hill. In October 2014, Kaplan succeeded Marne Levine as Facebook's vice president of global public policy.

Within the company, Kaplan advocated against restrictions on racially incendiary speech. He played an important role in crafting an exception for newsworthy political discourse when deciding on whether content violated the community guidelines. During the 2016 election, Kaplan advocated against closing down Facebook groups which allegedly peddled fake news. Kaplan argued that getting rid of the groups would have disproportionately targeted conservatives. During and after the 2016 US presidential election, Kaplan argued against Facebook publicly disclosing the extent of Russian influence operations on the platform.  

In 2017, after Facebook had implemented changes to its algorithm to expose users to more content by family and friends and less by publishers who were determined by Facebook to engage in misinformation, Kaplan questioned whether the algorithm disproportionately hurt conservative publishers and successfully advocated for Facebook to change the algorithm again. 

He pushed against a proposed Facebook project that was intended to make Facebook users of different political views engage with each other in less hostile ways. Kaplan argued that this feature would lead conservatives to accuse Facebook of bias. Kaplan also reportedly advocated on behalf of Breitbart News and the Daily Caller within Facebook. Kaplan has helped to place conservatives in key positions in the leadership of Facebook.

In 2018, he advocated strongly for the Supreme Court nomination of Brett Kavanaugh. Kaplan sat behind Kavanaugh during his Senate confirmation hearings.

During Donald Trump's presidency, Kaplan was on friendly terms with the administration. At one point, the administration considered nominating him as head of the Office of Management and Budget.

Personal life
On April 8, 2006, Kaplan married Laura Cox Kaplan (formerly Laura Lyn Cox) in Washington, D.C. The Kaplan and Kavanaugh families share a close relationship, as described by Laura: "[w]e share our families."

See also 
 List of law clerks of the Supreme Court of the United States (Seat 9)

References

Facebook employees
White House Deputy Chiefs of Staff
Law clerks of the Supreme Court of the United States
George W. Bush administration personnel
Jewish American government officials
Harvard Law School alumni
United States Marine Corps officers
Living people
People from Weston, Massachusetts
1970 births
Massachusetts Republicans
Massachusetts Democrats
Law clerks of J. Michael Luttig